Peter Cotes (19 March 1912 – 10 November 1998) was an English director, producer, actor, writer and production manager.

Cotes was born as Sydney Boulting in Maidenhead, Berkshire. His brothers John and Roy Boulting became noted film makers. He began as an actor, before concentrating on theatre production. He was the original director of the world's longest-running production The Mousetrap, still playing at the St Martins Theatre, London. He wrote several books, including an acclaimed biography of Charlie Chaplin in 1951.

He was twice married: Myfanwy Jones (marriage annulled) and Joan Miller (widowed 1988). He died from natural causes in Chipping Norton, Oxfordshire, aged 86.

Cinema and television credits
 As actor
 Pal O'Mine (1936) ... Archie
 Pastor Hall (1940) ... Erwin Kohn
 Fingers (1941) (uncredited)
 The Gentle Sex (1943) (uncredited) ...Taffy
 Don't Take It to Heart (1944) ...Patterson, Junior Counsel
 The Way to the Stars (1945) ...Aircraftsman
 Beware of Pity (1946) ...Kosma
 The Upturned Glass (1947) ... Questioner

 As writer 
 London Playhouse (3 episodes, 1955–56)
Lady Must Sell (1955) (adaptation)
Summer in Normandy (1955) (production supervisor)
The Guv'nor (1956) TV episode (production supervisor)
 ITV Playhouse (1 episode 1956)
Ashes in the Wind (1956) (adaptation)
 ITV Play of the Week (1 episode 1965)
Winter in Ischia (1965) (television adaptation)

As producer
 London Playhouse (5 episodes 1955–56)The Inward Eye (1955) (producer)Lady Must Sell (1955) (producer)Fighting Chance (1955) (producer)Adeline Girard (1955) (supervising producer)Yesterday's Mail (1956) (producer)
 ITV PlayhouseWoman in a Dressing Gown (1956) (producer)
 BBC Sunday Night TheatreThe Road (1953) (producer)What the Public Wants (1959) (producer)
 The World of WoosterJeeves and the Delayed Exit of Claude and Eustice (1966) (associate producer)Jeeves and the Indian Summer of an Uncle (1966) (associate producer)As director BBC Sunday Night Theatre (1 episode 1953)The Road (1953) (uncredited)
 The Right Person (1955)
 London Playhouse (3 episodes 1955–56)Area Nine (1955)Lady Must Sell (1955)Yesterday's Mail (1956)
 Sword of Freedom (1 episode 1957)Alessandro (1957)
 The Young and the Guilty (1958)
 ITV Television Playhouse (5 episodes 1956–58)Ashes in the Wind (1956)Woman in a Dressing Gown (1956)The Young and the Guilty (1956)Not Proven (1957)Look in Any Window (1958)Shadow of the Vine (1962)
 ITV Play of the Week (1 episode 1964)The Offence (1964) (TV episode)
 Janie Jones, at the New Theatre, London, (opened 15 July 1968)

Selected theatre credits
 The Mousetrap'' (1952, director of original London stage production)

References

External links
 
 

1912 births
1998 deaths
English male film actors
English television directors
English theatre directors
English television producers
English theatre managers and producers
English writers
20th-century English male actors
Place of birth missing
20th-century English male writers
20th-century English businesspeople